Jesús Emmanuel Reyes (born February 21, 1993) is a Dominican professional baseball pitcher who is a free agent. He has played in Major League Baseball (MLB) for the Cincinnati Reds.

Amateur career
Reyes enrolled at ASA College and joined their baseball team where he pitched during his freshman season. He quickly became one of ASA's best pitchers, so the team moved Reyes into their starting rotation after his first outing of the season. In addition to a fastball, Reyes learned to throw a changeup and a slider. He made 9 starts for the Avengers, pitching to a 3–3 win–loss record with a 4.32 earned run average.

Professional career

Minor leagues
He signed with the Cincinnati Reds as an undrafted free agent in August 2014.
 He made his professional debut in 2015 with the Arizona League Reds and spent the whole season there, collecting a 5-4 record and 3.40 ERA in 13 games (five starts). In 2016, he played for the Dayton Dragons where he went 5-5 with a 2.40 ERA and 1.17 WHIP in 30 games (20 relief appearances), and in 2017, he played for both the Daytona Tortugas and the Pensacola Blue Wahoos, pitching to a combined 8-9 record and 3.60 ERA in 25 total starts between the two teams.

The Reds added him to their 40-man roster after the 2017 season.

Cincinnati Reds
On August 3, 2018, Reyes was called up to the Reds. On August 4, 2018, Reyes made his debut hitting Spencer Kieboom before throwing two scoreless innings. Reyes pitched in 5 games (5.2 innings) out of the Reds bullpen, giving up 2 earned runs for an ERA of 3.18.

New York Mets 
Reyes was claimed by the New York Mets in the minor league portion of the 2020 Rule 5 Draft. On November 7, 2021, he elected free agency.

Acereros de Monclova
On May 27, 2022, Reyes signed with the Acereros de Monclova of the Mexican League. He was released on November 15, 2022 he had a rough season appearing in 15 games 8 starts going 4-1 with a 5.23 era and 38 strikeouts in 43 innings.

References

External links

1993 births
Living people
Sportspeople from Santo Domingo
Major League Baseball players from the Dominican Republic
Major League Baseball pitchers
Junior college baseball players in the United States
Cincinnati Reds players
Arizona League Reds players
Dayton Dragons players
Daytona Tortugas players
Pensacola Blue Wahoos players
Louisville Bats players
Gigantes del Cibao players
Syracuse Mets players
Acereros de Monclova players
Dominican Republic expatriate baseball players in Mexico